Assim Jamal is an Indian actor who mainly works in Malayalam films. His debut movie was Kurukshetra directed by Major Ravi in which he appeared as a Pakistani official. He is known for his Villain roles. He did notable roles in Kurukshetra, Anwar, Casanovva, Honey Bee, Pakida, Lord Livingstone 7000 Kandi, Anarkali which was a major break for him in the industry. The performance in Anwar fetched him roles in Honey Bee and Pakida, which were largely appreciated.

Filmography

References

External links
 Metromatinee
 

Male actors in Malayalam cinema
Indian male film actors
Living people
Year of birth missing (living people)
21st-century Indian male actors
Male actors from Thrissur